Cebula is a Polish surname meaning "onion". Notable people with the surname include:

Erin Cebula, Canadian television personality
Edward Cebula (1917–2004), Polish footballer 
Józef Cebula (1902–1941), Polish priest
Konrad Cebula (born 1983), Polish footballer
Marcin Cebula (born 1995), Polish footballer
Tomasz Cebula (born 1966), Polish footballer

Polish-language surnames